Turai Umar Musa Yar'Adua (born 26 July 1957) is the widow of the former Nigerian president and former Katsina State Governor, Umaru Musa Yar'Adua.  She was the First Lady of Nigeria from 2007 until the death of her husband on 5 May 2010.

Education
Turai Yar'Adua was born in the Katsina metropolitan area of northern Nigeria in July 1957.  She attended Garama Primary School in Katsina as a child and proceeded to the Government Girls Secondary School, Kankiya, also in Katsina state.

Turai Yar'Adua also attended  Katsina College of Arts, Science and Technology in Zaria, Kaduna state, where she was reportedly named "best student" in 1980. In 1983, Turai Yar'Adua received a bachelor's degree in language from Ahmadu Bello University.

Personal life
Turai married Umaru Yar'Adua in 1975 and they have five daughters and two sons. Her two sons are Shehu Umaru Musa Yar'adua and Musa Umar Musa Yar'adua. Shehu is the name of Umaru Yar'adua's elder brother and former de facto vice president of Nigeria, Shehu Musa Yar'Adua. One of their daughters, Zainab, is married to Usman Saidu Nasamu Dakingari, a former governor of Kebbi state.

In September 2007, Turai was the guest of honour at the commissioning of the Mobility Aid and Braille Centre in Akure, Ondo State. The centre was built by the Handicapped Education Foundation (HANDEF), a non-governmental organization founded by Olufunke Agagu, then First Lady of Ondo State. Also, in attendance at the event were the Vice President's wife, Patience Jonathan, and the wives of other state governors.

Turai was rumored to be one of her husband's closest advisors during his tenure as president of Nigeria. For example, it was believed that Turai Yar'Adua influenced the choice of Professor Babatunde Osotimehin, the former Director-General of the National Action Committee on AIDS, as Nigeria's Minister of Health, during her husband's administration.

Turai started her career as a teacher, before assuming the role of Katsina state's first lady, serving from
29 May 1999 – 29 May 2007, where she was noted for her empathy towards the plight of the less privileged.
Turai Yar’Adua visited the current First Lady, Mrs. Aisha Buhari at the presidential villa, Abuja, early
February  of the year, 2020. The former first lady came visiting with her daughter, Mrs Zainab Dakingari. The president’s wife, who personally broke the news on her Instagram page disclosed that the two of them discussed gender-based violence, drug abuse, and the development of the
country generally. Mrs. Buhari, who also shared the pictures of the visit on her page, added that she got Mrs. Yar’Adua’s perspectives on the issues, adding that Mrs. Yar’Adua reminisced on the past, especially the years she spent at the State House.

References

Living people
Nigerian Muslims
First Ladies of Nigeria
People from Katsina State
Ahmadu Bello University alumni
1957 births
Turai